Nebria bonellii is a metal coloured species of ground beetle in the Nebriinae subfamily that can be found in Georgia, Russia and Turkey.

References

bonellii
Beetles described in 1817
Beetles of Asia